Mirage is a name given to several types of jet aircraft designed by the French company Dassault Aviation (formerly Avions Marcel Dassault), some of which were produced in different variants. Most were supersonic fighters with delta wings. The most successful was the Mirage III in its many variants and derivatives, which were widely produced and modified both by Dassault and by other companies. Some variants were given other names, while some otherwise unrelated types were given the Mirage name.

Early prototypes
 MD550 Mystère Delta, the original Dassault experimental delta jet, which provided the baseline for the main Mirage series. Two were built, later renamed Mirage I and II respectively:
 Mirage I, being the MD550-01 renamed.
 Mirage II, being the MD550-02 renamed.

Mirage III/5/50 series

The most successful line of Mirages were a family of supersonic delta-winged fighters, all sharing the same basic airframe but differing in powerplant, equipment and minor details. Early examples were tailless, while many later variants had  canard foreplanes added.

France
The main production variants include:
 Mirage III, definitive production type which established the series.
 Mirage 5, developed from the Mirage III.
 Mirage 50, developed from the Mirage 5.

Minor projects and prototypes include:
 Balzac, Mirage IIIT and Mirage IIIV: Prototypes researching supersonic VTOL design. The Balzac and Mirage IIIV both had VTOL capability.
 Milan: a Mirage III example, modified with retractable foreplanes or "moustaches".
 Mirage IIING, developed from the Mirage 50 along with fixed canard foreplanes similar to the preceding Milan (see above). Like the Milan, only one airframe was converted.

Israel
Israel produced several progressive developments of the Mirage 5:
 IAI Nesher, a standard Mirage 5 with revised avionics.
 IAI Kfir, re-engined with further revised avionics and canard foreplane.
 IAI Nammer, again re-engined with further revised avionics and canard foreplane. Prototype only.

South Africa
South Africa upgraded its fleet of Mirage IIIs to meet local requirements:
 Atlas Cheetah, a Mirage III upgrade based on the IAI Kfir.

Chile
Chile upgraded its fleet of Mirage 50s to meet local requirements:
 ENAER Pantera (Mirage 50CN and 50DC), a Mirage 50 upgrade based on the IAI Kfir.

Other Mirage types

Production models
 Mirage IV: Delta-winged tailless supersonic nuclear bomber. Largest of all the Mirages.
 Mirage F1 and MF2000: Conventional-configuration supersonic fighter.
 Mirage 2000 supersonic tailless delta-winged successor to the Mirage 50, with an all-new airframe.

Prototypes
 Mirage F2 and Mirage G: Strike fighters, larger than the basic Mirage III airframe. The Mirage G prototypes were variable-geometry "swing wing" aircraft derived from the F2 fixed-wing design project.
 Mirage 4000 or Super Mirage 4000: Prototype larger version of the Mirage 2000 design.

References

Citations

Bibliography
 Garcia, Miguel, and Waseb Al-Qisuini. Iraqi Mirages in Combat: The Story of the F. I EQ in Iraq. Monee, Illinois, 2018. 
 Green, W. and Swanborough, G.; The Complete Book of Fighters, Salamander, 1994.  
 France (III), q-zon-fighterplanes.com (retrieved 11:54, 2 October 2015 (UTC))
 Rivas, Santiago, and Juan Carlos Cicalesi. Latin American Mirages: Mirage III / 5 / F.1 / 2000 in Service with South American Air Arms. Houston, TX: Harpia Publishing, 2010. 

Mirage